Milan Robberechts (born 4 March 2004) is a Belgian professional footballer who plays as a winger for Mechelen.

Career
Robberechts is a youth product of the academy of Grimbergen, and moved to Mechelen's youth side in 2014. He signed his first professional contract with Mechelen on 28 July 2021 for 3 years. made his professional debut with Mechelen in a 5–4 Belgian First Division A win over Westerlo on 21 August 2022; coming on as a substitute in the 71st minute while Mechelen was trailing 2–4, he scored a brace that ultimately gave Mechelen the comeback win.

International career
Robberechts is a youth international for Belgium, having played for the Belgium U18s in 2018.

Personal life
Not much is known about the Mechelen youngster but he is known to be an avid user of Discord.

References

External links
 
 ACFF Profile

2004 births
Living people
Belgian footballers
Belgium youth international footballers
K.V. Mechelen players
Belgian Pro League players
Association football wingers